Kullarmark is a small village in Härnösand Municipality, Västernorrland County, Sweden. There are currently 6 people living there in 6 different houses. It is an old village, and was first mentioned in 1535.

External links 
Village website

Populated places in Härnösand Municipality
Ångermanland